Established in 1947, Jetking Infotrain Limited is an Indian computer networking institute, which trains technical and non-technical students. Jetking has 100 centers spread across India .

Educational courses
Jetking is an ISO recognised institute. Jetking provides courses like JCHNE+, JCHNP and MNA+ (now JCHNE has been replaced from DNA) which entails students education in the field of Computer Hardware and Networking. Other courses like CCNA and Network Security and Ethical Hacking are also provided

Operations and domestic expansion
Jetking, which has 100 centres across the country at present. The company provides training to nearly 35,000 students each year.

International foray
Jetking has been said to have plans to open centres in Sri Lanka, Bangladesh, Nepal and Nigeria

References 

Education companies established in 1947
Education companies of India
1947 establishments in India by state or union territory